This is a list of members of the South Australian House of Assembly from 1993 to 1997, as elected at the 1993 state election:

 The Labor member for Elizabeth, Martyn Evans, resigned in early 1994 to contest a by-election for the federal seat of Bonython. Labor candidate Lea Stevens won the resulting by-election on 9 April 1994.
 The Liberal member for Torrens, Joe Tiernan, died on 31 March 1994. Labor candidate Robyn Geraghty won the resulting by-election on 7 May 1994.
 The Labor member for Taylor and former Premier of South Australia, Lynn Arnold, resigned in late 1994. Labor candidate Trish White won the resulting by-election on 5 November 1994.

Members of South Australian parliaments by term
20th-century Australian politicians